Madhav Bhattarai is a Nepalese writer and academic. He is chairman of the Nepal committee of astrologers. He earned his PhD in Sanskrit literature. He writes in Sanskrit and Nepali.

Career 
Prof Dr Madhav Bhattarai worked a "Nayab Badaguruji", appointed by late king Birendra Bir Bikram Shah Dev.Beginning in March, 2005 Bhattarai served as a president of Nepal Panchanga Nirnayak Samiti. Bhattarai founded academic organizations and co-founded Kathmandu Shiksha Campus, the first education community campus affiliated with faculty of education, TU. He worked as a chief of Balmiki Campus as well as the Kathmandu Shiksha Campus  located at Kathmandu.

References

Nepalese writers
Living people
Year of birth missing (living people)
Nepalese astrologers